Shanjia is a railway station on the Taiwan Railways Administration West Coast line located in Shulin District, New Taipei, Taiwan.

History
The station was opened on 7 October 1903 as Soa-a-kha Station. In 2011, the old station was closed down and all of the trains were moved to the new building. It serves the community of Shanjia, located in Shulin. The station is only served by local trains.

Around the station
 Shulin Refuse Incineration Plant (1.6km to the southwest)
 Shanzijiao Park (150m to the southeast)
 Shulin Railroad Scenery Park (樹林鐵道地景公園）(300m to the northeast)
 Lujiaoxi Park (400m to the east)
 Shanjia Riverside Park (700m to the southwest)

See also
 List of railway stations in Taiwan

References

1903 establishments in Taiwan
Railway stations in New Taipei
Railway stations opened in 1903
Railway stations served by Taiwan Railways Administration